This is a list of the National Register of Historic Places listings in Salt Lake County, Utah, except those in Salt Lake City. Listings for Salt Lake City can be found here.

This is intended to be a complete list of the properties and districts on the National Register of Historic Places in Salt Lake County, Utah, United States. Latitude and longitude coordinates are provided for many National Register properties and districts; these locations may be seen together in a map.

There are more than 350 properties and districts listed on the National Register in the county, including six National Historic Landmarks. More than 200 of these sites, including four National Historic Landmarks, are located in Salt Lake City, and are listed separately; the 146 sites outside the city, including two National Historic Landmarks, are listed here. Six other sites in the county outside of Salt Lake City were once listed on the Register, but have been removed.



Current listings

|}

Former listings

|}

See also
 List of National Historic Landmarks in Utah
 National Register of Historic Places listings in Utah

References

External links

Salt Lake